20 Golden Greats (also known as Buddy Holly Lives) is a greatest hits album by Buddy Holly & the Crickets first released in the United Kingdom by EMI on February 17, 1978. The songs on the UK release were licensed to EMI by MCA Records, who released the album in North America. The album is now out of print.

The album became an instant success in the UK, being certified platinum by the British Phonographic Industry two months after the album's release and topping the UK Albums Chart for three weeks. It was also Buddy Holly's first number 1 album on the chart. The album was somewhat less successful in the United States peaking at number 55 on the Billboard 200, but ended up crossing over to the Country Albums chart, and was certified gold by the Recording Industry Association of America in 1983.
In 2003, it was ranked number 92 on Rolling Stone magazine's list of The 500 Greatest Albums of All Time, maintaining the ranking in the 2012 update and dropping to number 166 in the 2020 reboot of the list.

Track listing

Charts and certifications

Release history

References

External links

Buddy Holly compilation albums
1978 greatest hits albums
EMI Records compilation albums
MCA Records compilation albums
The Crickets compilation albums
Albums produced by Norman Petty
Compilation albums published posthumously